India–Kenya relations are bilateral diplomatic relations between the Republic of India and the Republic of Kenya.

History

As littoral states of the Indian Ocean, trade links and commercial ties between India and Kenya go back several centuries. Kenya has a large minority of Indians and Persons of Indian Origin living there who are descendants of labourers who were brought in by the British to construct the Uganda Railway .  
Prior to India's independence, the welfare of Indians in Southeast Africa gained the attention of Indian freedom fighters. Sarojini Naidu chaired the Mombasa session of the East African Indian Congress in 1924 and a fact-finding mission under K.P.S. Menon was sent there in 1934. After India's independence, it established an Office of the Commissioner for British East Africa resident in Nairobi in 1948.  Given deteriorating race relations between Indians and Kenyans, Jawaharlal Nehru appointed the senior diplomat Apa Pant as High Commissioner to Kenya. Nehru also gave support to Jomo Kenyatta and the Kenya African National Union party, asking Indians in Kenya to identify themselves with the locals. Despite worsening race relations in Kenya that led to the exodus of Asians there to India and Britain, economic cooperation between India and Kenya flourished and became an exemplar of South-South cooperation.
Following Kenyan independence in 1963, an Indian High Commission was established in Nairobi

Kenya and India are members of international fora like United Nations, Non-Aligned Movement, Commonwealth of Nations, G-77 and G-15 and the Indian Ocean Rim Association for Regional Cooperation and often cooperate with each other on these fora.

Economic ties
India and Kenya have growing trade and commercial ties. Bilateral trade amounted to $2.4 billion in 2010–2011 but with Kenyan imports from India accounting for $2.3 billion, the balance of trade was heavily in India's favour. India is Kenya's sixth largest trading partner and the largest exporter to Kenya. Indian exports to Kenya include pharmaceuticals, steel, machinery and automobiles while Kenyan exports to India are largely primary commodities such as soda ash, vegetables and tea. Indian companies have a significant presence in Kenya with Indian corporates like the Tata Group, Essar, Reliance Industries and Bharti Airtel operating there. The Indian public sector banks Bank of Baroda and Bank of India have operations in Kenya. Kenya has been trying to promote itself as a tourist destination in India. However air connectivity between the two countries is limited and is provided by Kenya Airways between Mumbai and Delhi to Nairobi. Services to Nairobi, which was Air India's second international destination, begun in 1951 was finally shut down by the airline in 2010. However, Air India has restarted flights on the Mumbai-Nairobi route since November 2019.

Technical cooperation
India offers 101 fully funded scholarships for Kenyans annually under its Indian Technical and Economic Cooperation Programme for training them in technical skills. The Exim Bank of India has provided Kenya with a loan of $61 million for overhauling its national power grid. India's Pan-African e-Network project seeks to make available teleeducation and telemedicine facilities to African countries including Kenya. Indian investments in Kenya are now worth $1.5 billion and India's pharmaceutical exports have played a key role in making essential drugs available at affordable prices in Kenya.

Resident diplomatic missions
 India has a High Commission in Nairobi and maintains an Assistant High Commission in Mombasa.
 Kenya has a High Commission in New Delhi.

Covid-19 crisis 
In March 2021, India gave 1 hundred thousand Covid-19 vaccines to Kenya on grant. Kenya donated 12 tonnes of tea, coffee and nuts to India for Covid-19 relief efforts during India's second wave Covid-19 crisis.

See also
 Indians in Kenya
 Hinduism in Kenya

References

 
Kenya
Kenya
Bilateral relations of Kenya